Woolnorth Wind Farm is a wind power complex, comprising two wind farms — Bluff Point and Studland Bay. They are located at the Woolnorth property at Woolnorth (which includes the location known as Cape Grim), in the far north-west of Tasmania, Australia. Both wind farms are operated by Woolnorth Wind Farm Holdings, a joint venture between Hydro Tasmania (who own a 25% share) and Shenhua Group (75% share).

Farms 
Bluff Point Wind Farm was constructed in two stages. The first consisted of six 1.75 MW Vestas V66 turbines and was commissioned in 2002.  Stage two, commissioned in 2004, expanded the wind farm with a further 31 of the same turbines, for a total generating capacity of 65 MW.

Studland Bay Wind Farm was commissioned in 2007 and consists of 25 Vestas V90 turbines, each with a capacity of 3 MW, for a total capacity of 75 MW.

Tours to the wind farms are available and operated by a private commercial entity.

Operations 
The generation table uses eljmkt nemlog to obtain generation values for each month. Records date back to 2011.

In May 2021, output was limited to ~75 MW.

See also

Wind power in Australia

References

Energy infrastructure completed in 2002
Energy infrastructure completed in 2004
Energy infrastructure completed in 2007
Wind farms in Tasmania
2002 establishments in Australia
Circular Head Council